Arthur Gallagher (July 5, 1918 – January 12, 1996) was an American rower. He competed in the men's double sculls event at the 1948 Summer Olympics.

References

1918 births
1996 deaths
American male rowers
Olympic rowers of the United States
Rowers at the 1948 Summer Olympics
Sportspeople from New York City